The Clarke Historical Museum (formerly the Clarke Memorial Museum) in Eureka, California contains the area's premier collection of California North Coast regional and cultural history. The facility has an entire Native American wing, Nealis Hall, which features an extensive internationally recognized collection of basketry, regalia, stoneware, implements, and other objects indicative of the culture and creativity of local and regional Native American groups including the Wiyot (whose ancestral territory the Clarke resides), Yurok, Karuk and Hupa Tribes. The Eureka Visitors Center is located in the main hall of the museum. The Clarke Museum is a 501 (c)3 non-profit.

History 
The Clarke Historical Museum was founded by Cecile Clarke (1885-1979). Miss Clarke was a local history teacher at Eureka High School. It was at Eureka High that she first started displaying her collection of local Native American basketry. In 1960, when the school ran out of room for her increasing collection of local history items, Miss Clarke sold her family sheep ranch and used the money to buy the old Bank of Eureka building, where she moved her collection. Miss Clarke taught for over 40 years and dedicated her life to the museum. Originally named the Clarke Memorial Museum, after her parents, it was renamed the Clarke Historical Museum in 2001, and now runs as a privately operated non-profit organization for the use, benefit, and awareness of the City of Eureka, surrounding cities and the local Native Indian tribes. The Native American wing, Nealis Hall, was built in 1979.

The museum is housed in the former Bank of Eureka & Savings Bank of Humboldt Building (1911) in Old Town Eureka, which is listed on the National Register of Historic Places both as an individual landmark and as a contributing building to the Eureka Historic District. The bank building was designed by noted San Francisco architect Albert Pissis in a Classical Revival or Neoclassical style. The building is notable for its glazed architectural terra-cotta facade. Quoined pavilions flank the recessed portico supported by ionic columns and an extensive balustraded parapet appears above the cornice.

See also
 Humboldt Bay Maritime Museum
 Humboldt County Historical Society
 List of museums in the North Coast (California)

References

External links
 Clarke Historical Museum

Commercial buildings on the National Register of Historic Places in California
Buildings and structures in Eureka, California
Commercial buildings completed in 1911
History museums in California
Museums in Humboldt County, California
Tourist attractions in Eureka, California
1911 establishments in California
National Register of Historic Places in Humboldt County, California